"Close Another Door" is a song written by Barry, Robin and Maurice Gibb and recorded by the Bee Gees, initially on their 1967 album Bee Gees' 1st and later as the B-side of "To Love Somebody".

The lead vocal was by Robin Gibb, joined by Barry Gibb on the chorus. This track was a rock number but near the end of the song, this track gets slower and featured the orchestral arrangement of Bill Shepherd.

Background
Along with "To Love Somebody" this track was not dated but was recorded around April 1967. It was recorded in Ryemuse Studios, London instead of IBC Studios. where the rest of the album was done.

The first verse was sung a cappella while a lengthy cadenza was sung after the last chorus.

The song concerns ageing and an old man in a nursing home.

Track listing

Personnel
 Robin Gibb — lead vocals
 Barry Gibb — acoustic guitar, backing vocals
 Maurice Gibb — bass and acoustic guitar
 Vince Melouney — electric guitar
 Colin Petersen — drums
 Bill Shepherd — orchestral arrangement

References

Bee Gees songs
Songs written by Barry Gibb
Songs written by Robin Gibb
Songs written by Maurice Gibb
Song recordings produced by Robert Stigwood
1967 songs